Rollkur or hyperflexion of the horse's neck is defined as "flexion of the horse's neck achieved through aggressive force" and is banned in International and Olympic sanctioned equestrian sports by the governing body, the International Federation for Equestrian Sports (FEI). The FEI recognises a distinction between rollkur and the riding of the horse in a deep outline not achieved by force.

Rollkur has been used by dressage and show jumping riders.  The technique has been controversial for some time; petitions and boycotts (including a threatened boycott of the London 2012 Olympics) have been created to ban the practice. The FEI moved to ban the practice following the release of video of Swedish dressage rider Patrik Kittel using rollkur during a competition warm-up, where the horse's tongue appeared to turn blue as a result of the manoeuvre.

Usage

Despite the official FEI rules of dressage, which state that "the head should remain in a steady position, as a rule slightly in front of the vertical, with a supple poll as the highest point of the neck", horses in FEI competition routinely work with their heads behind the vertical (BTV), in hyperflexion. Judges appear to penalize competitors for heavy use of BTV posture at lower levels of competition, but not at the higher levels of competition.

Most usage of the technique in recent times has been by dressage riders but rollkur was, and is still, used in other equestrian disciplines, most notably show jumping, before being adopted by some well-known dressage riders. However, it is not an old theory in dressage, either: François Baucher trained a similar method, although he did all his severe flexing at the halt, and in addition he connected the posture of the hind legs to the mix.

In dressage training, a rider who chooses to make the horse work for periods with its neck lowered and its head behind the vertical, is misunderstanding the physiology of the horse.  Relaxing a horse does not include forcing the horse to bring its head behind the vertical, which forces flexion of the neck at the 3-4th vertebrae, causing a ripple effect of the ligaments, muscles, and spine into dangerous positions, not to mention interfering with the large salivary glands that lay behind the horse's jowls.  The proper head position for a horse is slightly above the vertical, with the poll at the highest point, which is most natural for the horse and allows it to fully engage the hindquarters necessary for collection.

It is a misunderstanding of basic equine anatomy to suggest that forcing a horse to tuck its chin and bringing its head behind the vertical is beneficial or improves suppleness. The most extreme form of this hypertension of the neck is rollkur, where the horse is forced to lower its head and bend the neck at the 3rd, 4th, or 5th vertebrae, forcing chin as close to the horse's head as possible, and using the outside rein to shape the horse along with the rider adjusting their position in the saddle to gain the maximum effect. In short, the horse's breathing and ability to salivate is negatively impacted, weight load is shifted to the neck, which it can not sustain, so the horse hollows out its back and this causes the dreaded "spine-kissing". In such a position, the horse can not see what is ahead of it and in addition to causing great discomfort, the horse is no longer balanced, so it must work harder when it moves. Because it can not fully engage the hindquarters, its actions build muscle in the neck and change its shape over time, while building up the forearms that results in exaggerated motion when the hypertension is released. In the extreme, the horse's mouth touches the middle of its chest. Rollkur is not a quick movement lasting a few seconds, but is held for a length of time, through work at the walk, trot, and canter, including shortening and extension of the gaits.  Rollkur is not just longitudinal flexion (nose to chest or forelegs), but accompanied with repeated bending to the rider's leg.

Some riders who use rollkur accomplish the head position by lowering and fixing the hands until the horse yields its jaw backwards in response to the pressure on the bit. This technique (pulling in) goes against all classical riding. In classical dressage, the horse accepts the bit and the horse decides to come down with its head because it trusts the hands of the rider. In good companionship, it is possible to ask the horse to go a little deeper than the animal would do itself, but to obtain the extreme posture of rollkur does require physical coercion.

In western pleasure and related events, the same practice has been used for decades, though not called rollkur. Usually draw reins are used to achieve hyperflexion and a very low "headset" that is desired in competition. However, it differs from rollkur in significant ways, the primary being that pleasure horses are not typically asked for the high degree of collection and complex maneuvers, such as the passage and piaff, required of dressage horses.

Hyperflexion has become more common in international dressage over time. By the 2008 FEI Dressage World Cup, the 15 highest-scoring equine competitors spent the majority of performance time with their heads in hyperflexion (behind the vertical) in all of the primary gaits.

Rationale
Proponents point to leading riders and trainers who apply this technique and have consistent winning scores in the arena. Studies have supported this, with results indicating that horses in hyperflexion were awarded higher scores by judges in competition. The scoring advantage is attributed to greater exaggeration of the horses' leg and back movements, which thereby appear more expressive, as well as more extreme forward protraction of the front legs.

Health and welfare 
Hyperflexion of the neck has been linked to airway obstruction, musculoskeletal pathology, stress, fear, and pain in horses.

Horses ridden in hyperflexion show more conflict behaviors (resistance to the rider's commands) and signs of discomfort, even at the highest level of competition, indicating that the posture is aversive even after prolonged training and experience.

It also impacts forward vision, as horses have a relatively limited vertical field of vision and cannot see in front of them well with their noses pointing vertically downwards or backwards. This may itself lead to further stress while in the hyperflexed position, as the horse cannot adequately watch out for obstacles while moving forward.

Arguments for banning

Those who disagree with rollkur say it goes against the principles of classical dressage and the written rules of the FEI. This includes the fact that the horse is physically behind the vertical. This makes it difficult to check if the horse is correctly accepting the bit. During hyperflexion of the neck the cervical vertebrae are compressed, where classical dressage promotes lengthening and relaxation of the neck. With rollkur, impulsion and throughness may be lost due to a stiff, improperly stretched back. This can easily occur when the hand of the rider is not gently asking the horse to come low (but pulling in) - and/ or the horse is not accepting the hand, but bending in an attempt to evade the hand.  A pure disadvantage is that the horse is encouraged to bring its point of gravity towards the forehand.

The public and private debates remain as to whether rollkur constitutes animal abuse, both physically, due to the held over-flexed position which can include airway obstruction, tongue nerve damage (e.g. tongue hanging), over-foaming, nuchal ligament damage, etc., and mentally due to forced submission. Given that a similar practice is longstanding and routinely seen with the use of draw reins in schooling horses for events such as western pleasure, the debate has major ramifications across different disciplines.

References

External links
The Rollkur Controversy
Researchers explore neck hyperflexion in horses - Horsetalk.co.nz 28.1.09
Rollkur
Explanation of Rollkur's Disadvantages
Dutch Warmbloods study

Horse training
Dressage
Show jumping
Riding techniques and movements
Equine welfare
Western-style riding
Horse showing and exhibition